

Introduction 

The morphology and arrangement of bacteria are often a key factor in identifying their species. Their direct examination under the light microscope enables the classification of these Bacteria and Archaea .

Generally, the basic morphologies are spheres (coccus) and round-ended cylinders or rod shaped (bacillus). But, there are also other morphologies such as helically twisted cylinders (example Spirochetes), cylinders curved in one plane (selenomonads) and unusual morphologies (the square, flat box-shaped cells of the Archaean genus Haloquadratum). Other arrangements include pairs, tetrads, clusters, chains and palisades.

Coccus

A coccus (plural cocci, from the Latin coccinus (scarlet) and derived from the Greek kokkos (berry)) is any microorganism (usually bacteria) whose overall shape is spherical or nearly spherical. Describing a bacterium as a coccus, or sphere, distinguishes it from bacillus, or rod. This is the first of many taxonomic traits for identifying and classifying a bacterium according to binomial nomenclature.

Important human diseases caused by coccoid bacteria include staphylococcal infections, some types of food poisoning, some urinary tract infections, toxic shock syndrome, gonorrhea, as well as some forms of meningitis, throat infections, pneumonias, and sinusitis.

Arrangements
Coccoid bacteria often occur in characteristic arrangements and these forms have specific names as well; listed here are the basic forms as well as representative bacterial genera:
 pairs or diplococci (e.g. Neisseria spp.)
 groups of four or eight known respectively as tetrads and sarcina (e.g. Micrococcus spp.)
 bead-like chains (e.g. Streptococcus spp.)
 grapelike clusters (e.g. Staphylococcus spp.)

Bacillus
A bacillus (plural bacilli) is a rod-shaped bacterium. Although Bacillus, capitalized and italicized, specifically refers to the genus, the word bacillus (plural bacilli) may also be used to describe any rod-shaped bacterium, and in this sense, bacilli are found in many different taxonomic groups of bacteria. 

There is no connection between the shape of a bacterium and its colors in the Gram staining.

Arrangements
Bacilli usually divide in the same plane and are solitary, but can combine to form diplobacilli, streptobacilli, and palisades.

 Diplobacilli: Two bacilli arranged side by side with each other.
 Streptobacilli: Bacilli arranged in chains.

Coccobacillus

A coccobacillus (plural coccobacilli) is a type of rod-shaped bacteria. The word coccobacillus reflects an intermediate shape between coccus (spherical) and bacillus (elongated). Coccobacilli rods are so short and wide that they resemble cocci. Haemophilus influenzae and Chlamydia trachomatis are coccobacilli. Aggregatibacter actinomycetemcomitans is a gram negative coccobacillus which is prevalent in subgingival plaques. Acinetobacter strains may grow on solid media as coccobacilli.

Coxiella burnetti is also a coccobacillus.

Spiral

Spiral bacteria are another major bacterial cell morphology. Spiral bacteria can be sub-classified as spirilla, spirochetes, or vibrios based on the number of twists per cell, cell thickness, cell flexibility, and motility.

Bacteria are known to evolve specific traits to survive in their ideal environment.  Bacteria-caused illnesses hinge on the bacteria’s physiology and their ability to interact with their environment, including the ability to shapeshift.  Researchers discovered a protein that allows the bacterium Vibrio cholerae to morph into a corkscrew shape that likely helps it twist into — and then escape — the protective mucus that lines the inside of the gut.

See also
 Bacterial morphological plasticity
 Ferdinand Cohn – gave first named shapes of bacteria

References

External links
 Bacteria Picture Gallery

Bacteria
Morphology (biology)